Orono High School may refer to:

Orono High School (Maine)
Orono High School (Minnesota)